The 2013 McDonald's All-American Boys Game is an All-star basketball game that was played on April 3, 2013 at the United Center in Chicago, home of the Chicago Bulls. It is the 36th annual McDonald's All-American Game for high school boys. The game's rosters featured the best and most highly recruited blue chip boys high school basketball players graduating in 2013.  Chicago, which became the first city to host the game in back-to-back years in 2012, will continue to host the game annually at least until 2015. The Kentucky Wildcats landed a record number of 5 selections at the time of the original selection and an additional later commitment. The West team won the game by a 110–99 margin and Aaron Gordon was MVP.

Rosters

Kentucky established a record in 2013 with five selections (Andrew Harrison, Aaron Harrison, James Young, Marcus Lee and Dakari Johnson) to the 24-man roster as well as a late addition, Julius Randle who have committed to one college program, while Duke (Jabari Parker and Matt Jones), North Carolina (Isaiah Hicks and Kennedy Meeks), Florida (Kasey Hill and Chris Walker) each had a pair of selections among their respective recruiting classes. Arizona (Aaron Gordon and Rondae Hollis-Jefferson) also ended up with two commits after Gordon announced at the 2013 McDonald's All-American Boys Game media day. Later, Kansas had two selections as well, but Andrew Wiggins did not sign with Kansas until May 2013 to join Wayne Selden Jr.   The previous record of four athletes in a single school's recruiting class had been shared by Michigan (1991, featuring four of the group soon to be known as the Fab Five), Duke (1999) and Kentucky (2011) The state of Texas produced five and the state of California produced four nominees. Parker is a native of the host city. The game includes a pair of twins in the Harrison brothers, which had recently happened in 2009 and 2006. Nine of the top ten recruits, according to ESPN.com's Class of 2013 ESPN 100 listing were selected, but Julius Randle, who missed most of the season with a foot fracture was not selected, originally. On March 6, Randle was added to the roster. He committed to Kentucky on March 20.

East Roster

West Roster

Awards
On March 18, Parker earned the Morgan Wootten Male Player of the Year (also known as the McDonald's player of the year). The award recognizes "the McDonald's All-American who demonstrates outstanding character, exhibits leadership and exemplifies the values of being a student-athlete in the classroom and the community". He won the award over five other finalists: Aaron Gordon, Aaron Harrison, Andrew Harrison, Dakari Johnson and Andrew Wiggins.

On April 1, Demetrius Jackson won the boys skills contest, Nigel Williams-Goss won the three-point shooting contest and Chris Walker won the slam dunk competition at the Ratner Center.  Aaron Gordon posted 24 points and 8 rebounds to earn the MVP of the game.

Coaches
The West team was coached by:
 Head coach Mike Flaherty of Mt. Carmel High School (Chicago, IL)
 Asst coach Jasper Williams of Bloom Township High School (Chicago Heights, IL)
 Asst coach Brian Flaherty of Bremen High School (Midlothian, IL)

The East team was coached by:
 Head coach Freddy Johnson of Greensboro Day School (Greensboro, NC)
 Asst coach Steve Shelton of Greensboro Day School (Greensboro, NC)
 Asst coach Jeff Smith of Greensboro Day School (Greensboro, NC)

Game

References

External links
McDonald's All-American on the web
Roster on ESPN.com
box score

2012–13 in American basketball
2013
2013 in sports in Illinois
Basketball in Illinois